Dethala  is a village development committee in Darchula District in the Mahakali Zone of western Nepal. At the time of the 1991 Nepal census it had a population of 3155 people living in 507 individual households.

Dethala is a small Himalayan town surrounded by Naugarh Gad river which is a major tributary of the Chemeliya River. Dethala was ruled by a branch of Katyuri kings.
After the breakdown of Katyuri Dynasty, King Abhay Pal of Askot, the grandson of Katyuri King, Brahm Deo, brought a branch of Katyuri Dynasty, here as the Pal Thakuri to Dethala.  
The Pal Rajwar's latter ruled this area for ages.

References

External links
UN map of the municipalities of Darchula District

Populated places in Darchula District